Daniela Gassmann (born 23 July 1964) is a Swiss cyclist. She competed in the women's cross-country mountain biking event at the 1996 Summer Olympics. Gassman has come first in the 2011 and 2012 Zermatt Marathon.

References

External links
 

1964 births
Living people
Swiss female cyclists
Olympic cyclists of Switzerland
Cyclists at the 1996 Summer Olympics
Place of birth missing (living people)